Ambinder is a surname. Notable people with the surname include:

Marc Ambinder (born  1978), American university professor, journalist, and producer
Mike Ambinder, American experimental psychologist